Martha Jefferson Hospital is a Sentara Healthcare-owned nonprofit community hospital in Charlottesville, Virginia. It was founded in 1903 by eight local physicians. The 176-bed hospital has an employed staff of 1,600 and has 365 affiliated physicians. 
In its fiscal year ending September 30, 2010, Martha Jefferson Hospital:
	
 Handled 48,100 emergency department visits
 Registered 11,058 admissions and 214,0515 outpatient visits
 Had 6,390 operating room visits
 Made 111,437 physician office visits

The hospital owns 10 primary care and three specialty practices. Major services include a Cancer Care Center, Digestive Care Center, Cardiology Care Center, Orthopedics including Spine Surgery & Joint Replacement Surgery, Bariatric (Weight Loss) Surgery, Neurosciences including Neurosurgery and a Sleep Medicine Center, Stroke Care Center, Thoracic Surgery, Vascular Medicine & Surgery, and a Women's Health Center.

Relocation 
Over the years, the hospital expanded at its downtown-Charlottesville location on Locust Avenue. However, in the early 2000s, it was clear a new facility needed to be built to accommodate a growing number of patients and the ability to expand further in a more open area. The hospital chose an  campus adjacent to their current Outpatient Care Center on Pantops Mountain for the new facility.

Design and construction 
The new building is designed by Kahler Slater of Milwaukee, WI. Engineering firms include Graef, Anhult, Schloemer & Associates of Milwaukee; Ring & DuChateau of Milwaukee; Rummel, Klepper & Kahi LLP of Richmond, VA and Hughes, Good, O'Leary and Ryan of Atlanta, GA. The General Contractor is M. A. Mortenson Company of Brookfield, Wisconsin.

The new building has five floors and a basement. There are two wings for patient rooms, the Wendel Wing and the Cornell Wing, as well as a cancer wing, the Phillips Family Cancer Center. The emergency department is located on the southwest end of the second floor. The maternity ward is located in the central area of the third floor. Visitor access, as well as retail space, is located on the Northeast side of the third floor. The cafeteria is located on the northeast side of the fourth floor.

Sale of the old facility 
In September 2010, Martha Jefferson Hospital sold its downtown Charlottesville building to Octagon Partners. Octagon Partners later announced that the CFA Institute would move into a portion of the re-developed facility in 2013.

Merger 
On September 29, 2010, Martha Jefferson Hospital announced its intention to merge with Sentara Healthcare. The merger was finalized on June 1, 2011, making Martha Jefferson the tenth hospital Sentara Healthcare's not-for-profit integrated health system based in Norfolk, Virginia.

References

External links 
Martha Jefferson Hospital
Medical Facilities for Charlottesville Area, The Daily Progress, Aug. 20, 2004.
Martha Jefferson Hospital Sleep Medicine Center

Hospital buildings completed in 1904
Hospitals in Virginia
Hospitals established in 1904
Sentara Healthcare System
Charlottesville, Virginia